A cholagogue is a substance that is purported by humoral practitioners to encourage the discharge of bile from the system, purging it downward. Deployment is no longer recommended because the biliary purge, like the traditional kidney purge, can cause pancreatic problems.

In Patrick O'Brian's Post Captain (Ch. 10), which is set in the Napoleonic era, Stephen Maturin, one of the book's main characters (who is also a physician, naturalist and spy) sits in the snug of the Rose and Crown in Deal, Kent, and drinks a "good" tea described as an "unrivalled cholagogue".

Cyclovalone is a choleretic and cholagogic agent.

References

 Chambers, Ephraim, ed. (1728). Cyclopaedia, or an Universal Dictionary of Arts and Sciences (first ed.), s.v. "Cholagogue".
Webster's Revised Unabridged Dictionary, 1913 Edition.
Patrick O'Brian Post Captain'', 2002 paperback edition, page 315.

External links
 

Laxatives